are a class of corporations under Japanese law.

Types

There are three types of mochibun kaisha:

Gōmei gaisha, in which all members have unlimited liability for the company's debts (similar to a general partnership)
Gōshi gaisha, in which some members have unlimited liability and some have limited liability (similar to a limited partnership)
Gōdō gaisha, in which all members have limited liability (very similar to a U.S. limited liability company)

Mochibun kaisha are formed by preparing articles of incorporation and depositing the articles with a local Legal Affairs Bureau.

Civil code partnerships lack legal personality and are mainly used for investment funds and professional firms.

References

See also
Kabushiki kaisha
Yugen kaisha

Japanese business law
Japanese business terms
Types of business entity